Aaron Robinson is an American composer, conductor, and musicologist. He is the author of Does God Sing? – A Musical Journey. He created the musical work Black Nativity – In Concert: A Gospel Celebration. He also served as conductor and musical director in the PBS documentary On This Island. In 2013, he was nominated for an Emmy Award for composing Maine Public Broadcasting Network's Maine Arts series theme music.

Personal background 
Robinson attended Medomak Valley High School in Waldoboro, Maine. At 16 years of age—a self-taught musician who never took piano lessons—he became the organist at both the Broad Cove Community Church in Cushing and the Friendship United Methodist Church. By his late teens, he was creating, performing and producing concerts and theatrical productions, including the musical Moody Blue for which he wrote both the music and lyrics. According to a 2013 interview, Robinson studied composition and piano performance at the Boston Conservatory of Music with composer John Adams and Lawrence Thomas Bell, as well as film scoring with John Williams at the Berklee School of Music; but chose not to graduate with a degree. Instead, Robinson "went out and lived the life of music," as he said in a 2017 interview. In 2001, he became organist and choirmaster for "Music at Immanuel" at the Immanuel Baptist Church in Portland, Maine.

In 2009, he retired from public performing due to illness. During which time Robinson wrote the memoir, Does God Sing – A Musical Journey. It reached No. 5 on the Barnes & Nobles best-sellers non-fiction paperback list for March 2013.

Robinson lives on the coast of Maine with his wife and son.

Career 
Robinson has conducted works for the concert and theatrical stage, including Leonard Bernstein's Candide – The Concert Version. In 1997, Robinson conducted Treemonisha: The Concert Version by ragtime composer Scott Joplin at the Rockport Opera House in Rockport, Maine, with a new libretto by Judith Kurtz Bogdanove.

In 2001, he orchestrated, arranged, and conducted the musical Islands, which was produced on Broadway at the New Victory Theater by John Wulp, with music and lyrics by Cidny Bullens.

Robinson conducted the world premiere performance of his Black Nativity – In Concert: A Gospel Celebration in 2001 at the Immanuel Baptist Church. The concert version recreated the original performance of Langston Hughes's Gospel Song-Play Black Nativity that opened in 1961 at the 41st Street Theatre in New York City. In 2004, the documentary film Black Nativity – In Concert: A Gospel Celebration was made about the world premiere performance, production, and creation under the direction of Robinson with the original cast. In December 2013, Robinson collaborated with Dr. Anthony Antolini and the Bowdoin College Chorus and Down East Singers to mount a revised version of his 2004 creation.

Robinson composed An American Requiem, which had its New England Premiere under the direction of Dr. Robert Russell and the USM Chorale. He also wrote Driving Old Memories (The Rockland Maine Song) with his father Ervin Robinson. On June 2, 2021, the Mayor of Rockland, Maine presented a key to the city and proclaimed June 2021 "Driving Old Memories" month.

In 2012 he wrote the music for the independent documentary In the Shadows of Grey Gardens In an article entitled "Robinson and Ragtime", David Welker called him "one of today’s leading proponents of early jazz and ragtime music". He is perhaps best known for his composition "The New England Ragtime Suite" for piano. 

In 2014, the opening of Maine Public Broadcasting's "Maine Arts!" Series received an Emmy Award at the 36th annual New England Emmy Awards for which Robinson contributed the series’ theme music and was nominated for a separate Emmy Award. Robinson composed the Maine-based musical, The Legend of Jim Cullen – A Dramatic Musical, which received its world premiere at the Heartwood Regional Theater Company in the summer of 2014.

In May 2017, Robinson premiered two choral works in Studzinski Hall at Bowdoin College: "Requiem For a New World" and "This Will Be Our Reply To Violence" with words by Leonard Bernstein. With a famous line taken from an address Bernstein gave a few days after the assassination of President John F. Kennedy, according to a 2017 interview, it was the first time the Bernstein Estate had ever granted a composer the rights to set the words to music. It was performed later that year by the Vox Nova Chamber Choir. Robinson received acclaim for his compositions from Maine's Senators Angus King and Susan Collins, who remarked: "With the scourge of violence unabated in our times, we all must increase our devotion to the highest ideals of humanity. Through your remarkable career as a composer, performer, and author, you are helping to elevate our nation as you bring distinction to our great state of Maine.”

Robinson collaborated with children's book author and illustrator Ashley Bryan in 2018 on an African-American Requiem titled "A Tender Bridge". The work celebrates Bryan's life and career based on his writings; and uses "jazz, ragtime, Negro spirituals, Southern hymns and other musical idioms, along with a full choir, gospel choir, children’s choir, orchestra jazz ensemble and multiple narrators."

Published works 
 Robinson, Aaron (2013). Does God Sing?: A Musical Journey, Tate Publishing. 182 pages. 
 Langston, Hughes (1961) Aaron Robinson (2004). Black Nativity, Dramatic Publishing. 34 pages.

Filmography

Television

Film

Discography

Awards and nominations

References

External links
 
 Maine Public Broadcasting Network "Aaron Robinson – "Does God Sing – A Musical Journey" (audio re-broadcast)
 “Voices of 'pure joy' ; 'Black Nativity' boasts spiritual songs and poetry of Langston Hughes”
 The Camden Herald “A ’Nativity’ with Soul”
 Boothbay Register “Alna author tells stories of music’s power”   
 WCSH 6 “Composer and Author Aaron Robinson”

1970 births
American male classical composers
American classical composers
Living people
Ragtime composers
People from Camden, Maine
Musicians from Maine
Boston Conservatory at Berklee alumni
Berklee College of Music alumni